Hansa Records (also known as Hansa, Hansa Musik Produktion or Hansa International) was a record label founded in the 1960s based in Berlin, Germany.

Profile
 The label's most successful act commercially was the German-based band Boney M. with million-selling hits like "Rivers of Babylon", "Brown Girl in the Ring" and "Mary's Boy Child - Oh My Lord".  David Bowie mastered Low and recorded Heroes at their studio in Berlin.  After a decline in sales both domestically and internationally in the mid 80s, Hansa was eventually purchased by Bertelsmann Music Group, who merged them with several other labels like Ariola Records to form BMG Berlin Musik GmbH/BMG-Ariola, later to become part of international conglomerate Sony Music Entertainment, under which it was phased-out in 2009. It is used today only for reissues of its previous releases.

Artists signed, recorded and/or released on Hansa
 Kent: Röd
 The Action
 Alphaville
 Aneka
 Angletrax
 Blue System
 Boney M.
 Bonnie Tyler: Bitterblue (1991), Angel Heart (1992), Silhouette in Red (1993)
 C. C. Catch
 Child 1978
 Chilly 1983
 Chris Norman
 David Bowie: Low (1977), Heroes (1977)
 Depeche Mode: Some Great Reward  (1984)
 Elton John: West Germany, Switzerland, and Austria, 1969–76
 Eruption
 Falco
 Frank Farian
 Gilla
 Giorgio Moroder 1966-1972
 Iggy Pop: The Idiot and Lust for Life (both 1977)
 Japan
 John Parr: Westward Ho (1990)
 La Mama
 Les McKeown
 Liz Mitchell
 Milli Vanilli
 M.C. Sar & the Real McCoy
 Modern Talking
 Münchener Freiheit: "Wachgeküsst"
 New Celeste "On the Line" (1979)
 Nick Nicely ("DCT Dreams")
 Die Prinzen
 Siouxsie and the Banshees
 Amii Stewart
 The Catch
 The Cure: released by Hansa before they finished recording an album
 The Hollies 1967-1973
 The Sugarhill Gang
 The Troggs 1966-1969
 The Twins
 U2: Achtung Baby
 Viola Wills
 Xhol Caravan: "Electrip"

See also
 List of record labels
 Hanseatic League, a region comprising much of maritime Germany, after which Hansa Records was named

References 
 

Defunct record labels of Germany
Rock record labels
Pop record labels
Record labels established in 1965
Record labels disestablished in 2009